James Foster may refer to:
 James Foster (Baptist minister) (1697–1753), English Baptist minister
 James Foster (architect) (c. 1748–1823), English mason and architect in Bristol
 James Foster (cricketer, born 1854) (1854–1914), English cricketer
 James Foster (cricketer, born 1980), English cricketer
 James Foster (economist) (born 1955), American economist, known for Foster–Greer–Thorbecke indices
 James Foster (ice hockey) (1905–1969), Scottish-born Canadian hockey player
 James Foster (ironmaster) (1786–1853), English ironmaster, owner of the Stourbridge Ironworks and various others, and a partner in Foster, Rastrick and Company
 James Foster (Mormon) (1786–1841), early leader in the Latter Day Saint movement
 James C. Foster, chairman and chief executive officer of Charles River Laboratories, Inc.
 James H. Foster (1827–1907), Wisconsin politician
 James W. Foster (died 1932), American politician
 James L. Foster, former Member of the Legislative Assembly of Alberta, 1971–1979
 James Foster, Libertarian candidate in the 2016 Oregon gubernatorial special election

See also
 Jim Foster (disambiguation)
 Jimmy Foster (disambiguation)